The 2018 Minnesota Twins season was the 58th season for the Minnesota Twins franchise in the Twin Cities of Minnesota, their ninth season at Target Field and the 118th overall in the American League. The Twins began the season on March 29 on the road against the Baltimore Orioles and ended the season at home against the Chicago White Sox. The Twins finished the 2018 season at 78–84, 13 games out of first place in a weak American League Central division.  The record led to the firing of manager Paul Molitor the day after the season ended.  Also, this season would prove to be the 15th and final season for career Twin Joe Mauer, who retired following the season.

Regular season

Season standings

Record vs. opponents

Roster

Game log 
The Twins played two games against the Cleveland Indians on April 17 and 18 at Hiram Bithorn Stadium in San Juan, Puerto Rico. The games were considered home games for the Twins. An island-wide power outage occurred on April 18, but  the game scheduled for that day was still played.

|-style=background:#fbb
|1||March 29||@ Orioles || 2–3 || Bleier (1–0) || Rodney (0–1) ||—|| 45,469 || 0–1 || L1
|-style=background:#bfb
|2||March 30||@ Orioles || 6–2 || Gibson (1–0) || Cashner (0–1) ||—|| 17,763 || 1–1 || W1
|-

|-style=background:#bfb
|3||April 1||@ Orioles || 7–0 || Berríos (1–0) || Gausman (0–1) ||—|| 17,212 || 2–1 || W2
|-style=background:#fbb
|4||April 2||@ Pirates || 4–5 || Taillon (1–0) || Lynn (0–1) || Kontos (1)|| 30,186 || 2–2 || L1
|-style=background:#bfb
|5||April 4||@ Pirates || 7–3 || Rogers (1–0) || Nova ||—|| 20,690 || 3–2 || W1
|-style=background:#bfb
|6||April 5|| Mariners || 4–2 || Duke (1–0) || Altavilla (0–1) || Rodney (1) || 39,214 || 4–2 || W2
|-style=background:#fbb
|7||April 7|| Mariners || 4–11  || Leake (2–0) || Berríos (1–1) ||—|| 18,416 || 4–3 || L1
|-style=background:#bbb
| – ||April 8|| Mariners || Colspan=7| Postponed (snow) (Makeup date: May 14.)
|-style=background:#fbb
|8||April 9|| Astros || 2–0 || Verlander (2–0) || Rogers (1–1) || Giles || 15,521 || 4–4 || L2
|-style=background:#bfb
|9||April 10|| Astros || 4–1 || Odorizzi (1–0) || Keuchel (0–2) || Rodney (2) || 15,500 || 5–4 || W1
|-style=background:#bfb
|10||April 11|| Astros ||9–8|| Rodney (1–1) || Peacock (1–1) ||—||15,438||6–4||W2
|-style=background:#bfb
|11||April 12|| White Sox || 4–0 || Berríos (2–1) || Giolito (0–2) ||—|| 15,474 || 7–4 || W3
|-style=background:#bbb
| – ||April 13|| White Sox || Colspan=7| Postponed (snow) (Makeup date: June 5) 
|-style=background:#bbb
| – ||April 14|| White Sox || Colspan=7| Postponed (snow) (Makeup date: September 28) 
|-style=background:#bbb
| – ||April 15|| White Sox || Colspan=7| Postponed (snow) (Makeup date: August 20) 
|-style=background:#fbb
|12||April 17|| Indians || 1–6 || Kluber (2–1) || Odorizzi (1–1) ||—|| 19,519 || 7–5 || L1
|-style=background:#cfc
|13||April 18|| Indians || 2–1 (16) || Busenitz (1–0) || Tomlin (0–2) ||—|| 19,537 || 8–5 || W1
|-style=background:#fbb
|14||April 20||@ Rays || 7–8 (10) || Colomé (1–2) || Duke (1–1) ||—|| 9,786 || 8–6 || L1
|-style=background:#fbb
|15||April 21||@ Rays || 1–10 || Snell (3–1) || Gibson (1–1) ||—|| 10,106 || 8–7 || L2
|-style=background:#fbb
|16||April 22||@ Rays || 6–8 || Colomé (2–2) || Reed (0–1) ||—|| 12,515 || 8–8 || L3
|-style=background:#fbb
|17||April 23||@ Yankees || 1–14 || Tanaka (3–2) || Odorizzi (1–2) ||—|| 39,249 || 8–9 || L4
|-style=background:#fbb
|18||April 24||@ Yankees || 3–8 || Sabathia (1–0) || Berríos (2–2) ||—|| 39,025 || 8–10 || L5
|-style=background:#fbb
|19||April 25||@ Yankees || 4–7 || Green (2–0) || Lynn (0–2) || Chapman (4) || 39,243 || 8–11 || L6
|-style=background:#fbb
|20||April 26||@ Yankees || 3–4 || Betances (1–1) || Rodney (1–2) ||—|| 40,758 || 8–12 || L7
|-style=background:#fbb
|21||April 27|| Reds || 9–15 || Hernandez (1–0) || Duffey (0–1) || — || 25,002 || 8–13 || L8
|-style=background:#cfc
|22||April 28|| Reds || 3–1 || Odorizzi (2–2) || Romano (1–3) || Rodney (3) || 27,115 || 9–13 || W1
|-style=background:#fbb
|23||April 29|| Reds || 2–8 || Mahle (2–3) || Berríos (2–3) || — || 25,677 || 9–14 || L1
|-style=background:#fbb
|24||April 30|| Blue Jays || 5–7 || Sanchez (2–2) || Lynn (0–3) || Osuna (7) || 16,456 || 9–15 || L2
|-

|-style=background:#fbb
|25||May 1|| Blue Jays || 4–7 (10) || Clippard (4–0) || Curtiss (0–1) || Osuna (8) || 16,245 || 9–16 || L3
|-style=background:#cfc
|26||May 2|| Blue Jays || 4–0 || Romero (1–0) || Stroman (0–4) ||—|| 16,420 || 10–16 || W1
|-style=background:#fbb
|27||May 3||@ White Sox || 5–6 || Jones (2–0) || Reed (0–2) ||—|| 13,260 || 10–17 || L1
|-style=background:#cfc
|28||May 4||@ White Sox || 6–4 || Berríos (3–3) || Fulmer (2–2)|| Rodney (4) || 15,936 || 11–17 || W1
|-style=background:#cfc
|29||May 5||@ White Sox || 8–4 || Lynn (1–3) || Santiago (0–1) ||—|| 23,765 || 12–17 || W2
|-style=background:#cfc
|30||May 6||@ White Sox || 5–3 || Duke (2–1) || Rondón (1–2) || Rodney (5) || 17,424 || 13–17 || W3
|-style=background:#cfc
|31||May 7||@ Cardinals || 6–0 || Romero (2–0) || Gant (1–1) ||—|| 40,182 || 14–17 || W4
|-style=background:#cfc
|32||May 8||@ Cardinals || 7–1 || Odorizzi (3–2) || Martínez (3–2) ||—|| 39,253 || 15–17 || W5
|-style=background:#fbb
|33||May 10||@ Angels || 4–7 || Álvarez (2–0) || Berríos (3–4) || Johnson (1) || 30,127 || 15–18 || L1
|-style=background:#cfc
|34||May 11||@ Angels || 5–4 || Magill (1–0) || Anderson (0–1) || Rodney (6) || 43,521 || 16–18 || W1
|-style=background:#cfc
|35||May 12||@ Angels || 5–3  || Hildenberger (1–0) || Ramirez (1–2) || Rodney (7) || 40,117 || 17–18 || W2
|-style=background:#fbb
|36||May 13||@ Angels || 1–2 || Parker (1–1) || Duke (2–2) || — || 38,029 || 17–19 || L1
|-style=background:#fbb
|37||May 14|| Mariners || 0–1 || Pazos (1–0) || Hildenberger (1–1) || Diaz (14) || 16,581 || 17–20 || L2
|-style=background:#cfc
|38||May 15|| Cardinals || 4–1 || Berríos (4–4) || Cecil (0–1) || Rodney (8) || 24,259 || 18–20 || W1
|-style=background:#fbb
|39||May 16|| Cardinals || 5–7 || Hicks (2–1) || Lynn (1–4) || Norris (9) || 25,180 || 18–21 || L1
|-style=background:#fbb
|40||May 18|| Brewers || 3–8 || Suter (3–3) || Gibson (1–2) || — || 29,349 || 18–22 || L2
|-style=background:#fbb
|41||May 19|| Brewers || 4–5 || Hader (2–0) || Reed (0–3) ||—|| 30,182 || 18–23 || L3
|-style=background:#cfc
|42||May 20|| Brewers || 3–1 || Reed (1–3) || Guerra (0–2) || Rodney (9) || 28,577 || 19–23 ||W1
|-style=background:#cfc
|43||May 21|| Tigers || 4–2 || Berríos (5–4) || Stumpf (1–3) || Rodney (10) || 17,161 || 20–23 || W2
|-style=background:#cfc
|44||May 22|| Tigers || 6–0 || Lynn (2–4) || Boyd (2–4) ||—|| 25,559 || 21–23 || W3
|-style=background:#fbb
|45||May 23|| Tigers || 1–4 || Fulmer (2–3) || Gibson (1–3) || Greene (11)|| 23,891 || 21–24 || L1
|-style=background:#fbb
|46||May 25||@ Mariners || 1–2 || Paxton (4–1) || Romero (2–1) || Díaz (18) || 19,924 || 21–25 ||L2
|-style=background:#fbb
|47||May 26||@ Mariners || 3–4 (12) || Bradford (4–0) || Magill (1–1) ||—|| 23,986 || 21–26 ||L3
|-style=background:#fbb
|48||May 27||@ Mariners || 1–3 || Leake (5–3)  || Berríos (5–5) || Colomé (12)|| 31,340 || 21–27 ||L4
|-style=background:#cfc
|49||May 28||@ Royals || 8–5 || Lynn (3–4) || Junis (5–4) || Rodney (11) || 18,572 || 22–27 || W1
|-style=background:#fbb
|50||May 29||@ Royals || 1–2 (10) || Barlow (1–0) || Rogers (1–2) ||—|| 20,533 || 22–28 || L1
|-style=background:#fbb
|51||May 30||@ Royals || 8–11 || McCarthy (4–2) || Romero (2–2) || Herrera (12) || 21,343 || 22–29 || L2
|-style=background:#fbb
|52||May 31|| Indians || 8–9 || Olson (1–1) || Reed (1–4) || Allen (9) || 19,148 || 22–30 || L3
|-

|-style=background:#cfc
|53||June 1|| Indians || 7–4 || Berríos (6–5) || Carrasco (6–4) || Rodney (12) || 30,171 || 23–30 || W1
|-style=background:#cfc
|54||June 2|| Indians || 7–1 || Lynn (4–4) || Bauer (4–4) ||—|| 23,476 || 24–30 || W2
|-style=background:#cfc
|55||June 3|| Indians || 7–5 || Rodney (2–2) || Allen (2–2) ||—|| 26,096 || 25–30 || W3
|-style=background:#cfc
|56||June 5|| White Sox || 4–2 || Duffey (1–1) || Jones (2–2) || Rodney (13) || 26,261 || 26–30 || W4
|-style=background:#fbb
|57||June 5|| White Sox || 3–6 || Giolito (4–6) || Littell (0–1) || Soria (5) || 26,261 || 26–31 || L1
|-style=background:#fbb
|58||June 6|| White Sox || 2–5 || Santiago (2–2) || Odorizzi (3–3) || Soria (6) || 20,393 || 26–32 || L2
|-style=background:#cfc
|59||June 7|| White Sox || 7–2 || Berríos (7–5) || Shields (1–7) ||—|| 21,469 || 27–32 || W1
|-style=background:#fbb
|60||June 8|| Angels || 2–4 || Ramirez (2–2) || Pressly (0–1) || Parker (6) || 28,383 || 27–33 || L1
|-style=background:#fbb
|61||June 9|| Angels || 1–2 || Skaggs (5–4) || Gibson (1–4) || Parker (7) || 24,061 || 27–34 || L2
|-style=background:#cfc
|62||June 10|| Angels || 7–5 || Romero (3–2) || Tropeano (3–4) ||—|| 28,656 || 28–34 || W1
|-style=background:#cfc
|63||June 12||@ Tigers || 6–4 || Pressly (1–1) || Coleman (3–1) || Rodney (14) || 20,340 || 29–34 || W2
|-style=background:#fbb
|64||June 13||@ Tigers || 2–5 || Jiménez (3–0) || Reed (1–5) || Greene (16) || 19,206 || 29–35 || L1
|-style=background:#fbb
|65||June 14||@ Tigers || 1–3 ||Fulmer (3–5) ||Lynn (4–5) || Greene (17) || 27,573 || 29–36 || L2
|-style=background:#cfc
|66||June 15||@ Indians || 6–3 ||Gibson (2–4)||Kluber (10–3) || Rodney (15) || 32,637 || 30–36 || W1
|-style=background:#cfc
|67||June 16||@ Indians || 9–3 ||Magill (2–1) ||Carrasco (8–5) ||—|| 30,282 || 31–36 || W2
|-style=background:#fbb
|68||June 17||@ Indians || 1–4 ||Bieber (1–0) || Odorizzi (3–4) ||Allen (14) || 27,128 || 31–37 || L1
|-style=background:#cfc
|69||June 19|| Red Sox || 6–2 ||Duke (3–2) ||Scott (0–1) ||—|| 28,550 || 32–37 || W1
|-style=background:#cfc
|70||June 20|| Red Sox || 4–1 ||Lynn (5–5) ||Price (8–5) ||Rodney (16) || 33,153 || 33–37 || W2
|-style=background:#fbb
|71||June 21|| Red Sox || 2–9 ||Porcello (9–3)||Gibson (2–5) ||—|| 32,631 || 33–38 || L1
|-style=background:#fbb
|72||June 22|| Rangers || 1–8 ||Minor (5–4) ||Romero (3–3) || Chavez (1) || 28,004 ||33–39 ||L2
|-style=background:#fbb
|73||June 23|| Rangers || 6–9 ||Gallardo (1–0) ||Odorizzi (3–5) ||Kela (18) || 23,230 || 33–40 || L3
|-style=background:#cfc
|74||June 24|| Rangers || 2–0 || Berríos (8–5) ||Colón (4–5) ||Rodney (17) || 23,633 || 34–40 || W1
|-style=background:#fbb
|75||June 26||@ White Sox || 4–8 || Lopez (3–5) ||Lynn (5–6) ||—|| 16, 276 || 34–41 || L1
|-style=background:#fbb
|76||June 27||@ White Sox || 1–6 || Shields (3–9) || Gibson (2–6) ||—|| 19,466 ||34–42 || L3
|-style=background:#cfc
|77||June 28||@ White Sox || 2–1 (13) || Busenitz (2–0) || Santiago (2–3) ||—|| 21,610 ||35–42 || W1
|-style=background:#fbb
|78||June 29||@ Cubs || 6–10 || Montgomery (3–2) || Berríos (8–6) || Morrow (17) || 41,492 || 35–43 || L1
|-style=background:#fbb
|79||June 30||@ Cubs || 9–14 || Wilson (2–2) || Hildenberger (1–2) ||—|| 40,950 || 35–44 || L2
|-

|-style=background:#fbb
|80||July 1||@ Cubs || 10–11 || Lester (11–2) || Lynn (5–7) || Morrow (18) || 40,051 || 35–45 || L3
|-style=background:#fbb
|81||July 2||@ Brewers || 5–6 (10) || Knebel (2–0) || Littell (0–2) ||—|| 31,353 || 35–46 || L4
|-style=background:#fbb
|82||July 3||@ Brewers || 0–2 || Guerra (5–5) || Odorizzi (3–6) || Knebel (9)|| 32,375 || 35–47 || L5
|-style=background:#fbb
|83||July 4||@ Brewers || 2–3 || Jeffress (6–1) || Berríos (8–7) || Knebel (10) || 36,700 || 35–48 || L6
|-style=background:#cfc
|84||July 5|| Orioles || 5–2 || Slegers (1–0) || Cashner (2–9) || Rodney (18) || 23,895 || 36–48 || W1
|-style=background:#cfc
|85||July 6|| Orioles || 6–2 || Lynn (6–7) || Bundy (6–8) ||—|| 27,570 || 37–48 || W2
|-style=background:#cfc
|86||July 7|| Orioles || 5–4 || Gibson (3–6) || Castro (2–5) || Rodney (19) || 25,974 || 38–48 || W3
|-style=background:#cfc
|87||July 8|| Orioles || 10–1 || Odorizzi (4–6) || Cobb (2–11) ||—|| 22,557 || 39–48 || W4
|-style=background:#cfc
|88||July 9|| Royals || 3–1 || Berríos (9–7) || Hill (1–3) || Rodney (20) || 20,199 || 40–48 || W5
|-style=background:#fbb
|89||July 10|| Royals || 4–9 || Flynn (1–1)|| Slegers (1–1) ||—|| 27,551 || 40–49 || L1
|-style=background:#cfc
|90||July 11|| Royals || 8–5 || Lynn (7–7) || Sparkman (0–1) ||—|| 26,708 
|| 41–49 || W1
|-style=background:#cfc 
|91||July 12|| Rays || 5–1  || Gibson (4–6) || Snell (12–5) ||Rodney (21) || 25,281 || 42–49 || W2
|-style=background:#cfc
|92||July 13|| Rays || 11–8 ||Hildenberger (2–2) || Eovaldi (3–4) ||—|| 28,756|| 43–49 || W3
|-style=background:#fbb
|93||July 14|| Rays || 6–19 || Schultz (1–0) || Duke (3–3) ||—|| 25,094 || 43–50 ||L1
|-style=background:#cfc
|94||July 15|| Rays || 11–7(10) || Busenitz (3–0) || Andriese (2–4) ||—|| 25,561 || 44–50 || W1
|-style=background:
|colspan="10"|89th All-Star Game in Washington, D.C.
|-style=background:#fbb
|95||July 20||@ Royals || 5–6 || Duffy (6–8) || Gibson (4–7) ||Maurer (1)|| 27,719 || 44–51 || L1
|-style=background:#fbb
|96||July 21||@ Royals || 2–4 || Flynn (2–1) || Lynn (7–8) ||Peralta (3)|| 22,159 || 44–52 || L2
|-style=background:#fbb
|97||July 22||@ Royals || 3–4 || Keller (3–4) || Duke (3–4) ||Peralta (4)|| 18,107 || 44–53 || L3
|-style=background:#cfc
|98||July 23||@ Blue Jays || 8–3 || Mejia (1–0) || Santos (0–1) ||—|| 25,405 || 45–53 || W1
|-style=background:#cfc
|99||July 24||@ Blue Jays || 5–0 || Berríos (10–7) || Borucki (0–2) ||—|| 31,933 || 46–53 || W2
|-style=background:#cfc
|100||July 25||@ Blue Jays || 12–6(11) || Belisle (1-0) || Petricka (1-1) ||—|| 32,686 || 47–53 || W3
|-style=background:#cfc
|101||July 26||@ Red Sox || 2–1 || Gibson (5-7) || Barnes (3-3) || Rodney (22)|| 37,439 || 48–53 || W4
|-style=background:#fbb
|102||July 27||@ Red Sox || 3–4 || Thornburg (1–0)|| Belisle (1–1) ||—|| 37,273 || 48–54 || L1
|-style=background:#fbb
|103||July 28||@ Red Sox || 4–10 || Porcello (13–4) || Odorizzi (4–7) ||—|| 36,798 || 48–55 || L2
|-style=background:#fbb
|104||July 29||@ Red Sox || 0–3 || Eovaldi (4–4) || Berríos (10–8) || Kimbrel (33)|| 36,785 || 48–56 || L3
|-style=background:#cfc
|105||July 30|| Indians || 5–4 || Rodney (3-2) || Ramirez (0-1) ||—|| 26,256 || 49–56 || W1
|-style=background:#fbb
|106||July 31|| Indians || 2–6 || Bauer (10–6) || Gibson (5–8) || Allen (21)|| 25,407 || 49–57 || L1
|-

|-style=background:#fbb
|107||August 1|| Indians || 0–2 || Carrasco (13–5) || Magill (2–2) || Hand (26)|| 29,261 || 49–58 || L2
|-style=background:#cfc
|108||August 3|| Royals || 6–4 || Moya (1–0) || Flynn (2-3) || Rodney (23)|| 22,236 || 50–58 || W1
|-style=background:#cfc
|109||August 4|| Royals || 8–2 || Berríos (11-8) || Smith (1-3) ||—|| 27,909 || 51–58 || W2
|-style=background:#cfc
|110||August 5|| Royals || 6–5 || Moya (2-0) || Duffy (7-10) || Rodney (24)|| 25,390 || 52–58 || W3
|-style=background:#fbb
|111||August 6||@ Indians || 0–10 || Bauer (11–6) || Gibson (5–9) || — || 18,620|| 52–59 || L1
|-style=background:#cfc
|112||August 7||@ Indians || 3–2 || Mejia (2–0) || Carrasco (13–6) || Rodney (25) || 19,921 || 53–59 || W1
|-style=background:#fbb
|113||August 8||@ Indians || 2–5 || Allen (4-4) || Hildenberger (2-3) || — || 25,476 || 53–60 || L1
|-style=background:#fbb
|114||August 9||@ Indians || 4–5 || Miller (2-3) || Reed (1-6) || — || 25,942 || 53–61 || L2
|-style=background:#cfc
|115||August 10||@ Tigers || 3–5 || Zimmermann (5–4) || Santana (0–1) || Greene (24) || 24,849 || 53–62 || W1
|-style=background:#cfc
|116||August 11||@ Tigers || 4–3 || Gibson (6–9) || Liriano (3–7) || Hildenberger (1) || 26,991 || 54–62 || W1
|-style=background:#fbb
|117||August 12||@ Tigers || 2–4 || Boyd (7–10) || Stewart (0–1) || Greene (25) || 30,105 || 54–63 || L1
|-style=background:#cfc
|118||August 14|| Pirates || 5–2 || Odorizzi (5–7) || Taillon (9–9) || Hildenberger (2) || 28,515 || 55–63 || W1
|-style=background:#cfc
|119||August 15|| Pirates || 6–4 || Moya (3–0) || Santana (2–2) || Hildenberger (3) || 26,191 || 56–63 || W2
|-style=background:#cfc
|120||August 16|| Tigers || 15–8 || May (1–0) || Liriano (3–8) || — || 25,108 || 57–63 || W3
|-style=background:#cfc
|121||August 17|| Tigers || 5–4 || Gibson (7–9) || Boyd (7–11) || Rogers (1) || 26,605 || 58–63 || W4
|-style=background:#fbb
|122||August 18|| Tigers || 5–7 || Carpenter (1–1) || Duffey (1–2) || Greene (26) || 31,904 || 58–64 || L1
|-style=background:#cfc
|123||August 19|| Tigers || 5–4 || Hildenberger (3–3) || Wilson (1–4) || — || 27,917 || 59–64 || W1
|-style=background:#fbb
|124||August 20||White Sox || 5–8 || Giolito (9–9) || Gonsalves (0–1) || — || 23,431 || 59–65 || L1
|-style=background:#cfc
|125||August 21||@ White Sox || 5–2 || May (2–0) || Covey (4–11) || Rogers (2) || 23,133 || 60–65 || W1
|-style=background:#fbb
|126||August 22||@ White Sox || 3–7 || Rodón (5–3) || Gibson (7–10) || — || 15,160 || 60–66 || L1
|-style=background:#cfc
|127||August 23|| A's || 6–4 || Busenitz (4–0) || Cahill (5–3) || Hildenberger (4) || 24,171 || 61–66 || W1
|-style=background:#fbb
|128||August 24|| A's || 1–7 || Manaea (12–9) || Odorizzi (5–8) || — || 22,568 || 61–67 || L1
|-style=background:#fbb
|129||August 25|| A's || 2–6 || Fiers (10–6) || Gonsalves (0–2) || — || 28,772 || 61–68 || L2
|-style=background:#fbb
|130||August 26|| A's || 2–6 || Buchter (3–0) || Berríos (11–9) || — || 23,318  || 61–69 || L3
|-style=background:#fbb
|131||August 28||@ Indians || 1–8 || Carrasco (16-7) || Gibson (7-11) || — || 19,194 || 61–70 || L4
|-style=background:#cfc
|132||August 29||@ Indians || 4–3 || May (3–0) || Allen (4–6) || Hildenberger (5) || 20,398 || 62–70 || W1
|-style=background:#fbb
|133||August 30||@ Indians || 3–5 || Clevinger (10–7) || Odorizzi (5–9) || Hand (30) || 20,244 || 62–71 || L1
|-style=background:#cfc
|134||August 31||@ Rangers || 10–7 || Magill (3–2) || Moore (3–7) || — || 22,808 || 63–71 || W1
|-

|-style=background:#fbb
|135||September 1||@ Rangers || 4–7 || Gallardo (8–5) || Berríos (11–10) || Leclerc (8) || 32,175|| 63–72 || L1
|-style=background:#fbb
|136||September 2||@ Rangers || 4–18 || Méndez (1–1) || Moya (3–1) || Butler (2) || 23,423 || 63–73 ||L2
|-style=background:#fbb
|137||September 3||@ Astros || 1–4 || Keuchel (11–10) || Gibson (7–12) || Peacock (3) || 39,559 || 63–74 ||L3
|-style=background:#fbb
|138||September 4||@ Astros || 2–5 || Verlander (14–9) || May (3–1) || Osuna (13) || 31,315 || 63–75 ||L4
|-style=background:#fbb
|139||September 5||@ Astros || 1–9 || Valdez (3–1) || Odorizzi (5–10) || — || 31,011 || 63–76 ||L5
|-style=background:#cfc
|140||September 7|| Royals || 10–6 || May (4–1) || Sparkman (0–3) || — || 19,944 || 64–76 ||W1
|-style=background:#fbb
|141||September 8|| Royals || 1–4 || López (2–4) || Berríos (11–11) || Peralta (9) || 25,814 || 64–77 ||L1
|-style=background:#cfc
|142||September 9|| Royals || 3–1 || Hildenberger (4–3) || Hammel (2–13) || — || 20,903 || 65–77 ||W1
|-style=background:#fbb
|143||September 10|| Yankees || 2–7 || Happ (16–6) || Gibson (7–13) || — || 21,565 || 65–78 ||L1
|-style=background:#cfc
|144||September 11|| Yankees || 10–5 || Stewart (1–1) || Gray (10–9) || — || 20,343 || 66–78 ||W1
|-style=background:#cfc
|145||September 12|| Yankees || 3–1 || Odorizzi (6–10) || Severino (17–8) || Hildenberger (4) || 24,134 || 67–78 ||W2
|-style=background:#fbb
|146||September 13||@ Royals || 4–6 || Fillmyer (3–1) || Busenitz (4–1) || Peralta (11) || 18,745 || 67–79 ||L1
|-style=background:#fbb
|147||September 14||@ Royals || 4–8 || Hammel (3–13) || Hildenberger (4–4) || — || 18,389 || 67–80 ||L2
|-style=background:#fbb
|148||September 15||@ Royals || 3–10 || Kennedy (2–8) || De Jong (0–1) || — || 19,505 || 67–81 ||L3
|-style=background:#cfc
|149||September 16||@ Royals || 9–6 || Gibson (8–13) || Vasto (0–1) ||—|| 20,286 || 68–81 ||W1
|-style=background:#cfc
|150||September 17||@ Tigers || 6–1 || Stewart (2–1) || Zimmermann (7–8) || — || 19,004 || 69–81 ||W2
|-style=background:#cfc
|151||September 18||@ Tigers || 5–3 || Odorizzi (7–10) || Norris (0–5) || Hildenberger (7) || 19,740 || 70–81 ||W3
|-style=background:#cfc
|152||September 19||@ Tigers || 8–2 || Gonsalves (1–2) || Turnbull  (0–1) || — || 19,296 || 71–81 ||W4
|-style=background:#fbb
|153||September 21||@ A's || 6–7(11) || Treinen (8–2) || Magill (3–3) || — || 27,558 || 71–82 ||L1
|-style=background:#fbb
|154||September 22||@ A's || 2–3 || Treinen (9–2) || Hildenberger (4–5) || — || 36,731 || 71–83 || L2
|-style=background:#cfc
|155||September 23||@ A's || 5–1 || Gibson (9–13) || Cahill (6–4) || May (1) || 35,754 || 72–83 || W1
|-style=background:#fbb
|156||September 25|| Tigers || 2–4 || Alcántara (1–0) || Hildenberger (4–6) || Greene (32) || 23,849 || 72–84 || L1
|-style=background:#cfc
|157||September 26|| Tigers || 11–4 || Duffey (2–2) || Boyd (9–13) || — || 21,316 || 73–84 || W1
|-style=background:#cfc
|158||September 27|| Tigers || 9–3 || Gonsalves (2–2) || Liriano (5–12) || — || 22,342 || 74–84 || W2
|-style=background:#cfc
|159||September 28|| White Sox || 2–1 || Berríos (12–11) || López (7–10) || May (2) || 20,245 || 75–84 || W3
|-style=background:#cfc
|160||September 28|| White Sox || 12–4 || Jong (1–1) || Giolito (10–13) || — || 28,191 || 76–84 || W4
|-style=background:#cfc
|161||September 29|| White Sox || 8–3 || Gibson (10–13) || Rodón (6–8) || — || 32,717 || 77–84 || W5
|-style=background:#cfc
|162||September 30|| White Sox || 5–4 || Vasquez (1–0) || Covey (5–14) || May' (3) || 30,144 || 78–84 || W6
|-

|- style="text-align:center;"
| Legend:       = Win       = Loss       = PostponementBold = Twins team member

Source

Farm system

Source

References

External links
2018 Minnesota Twins season at Baseball Reference''

2018
2018 Major League Baseball season
2018 in sports in Minnesota